Tensung Namgyal (1644–1700) was the second chogyal (monarch) of Sikkim. He succeeded his father Phuntsog Namgyal in 1670 and moved the capital from Yuksom to Rabdentse near Geyzing. He had three wives from Bhutan, Tibet and a Limbu princess, Thungwamukma. After establishing Rabdentse as his new capital he built a palace and asked his Limbu Queen to name it. She named it "Song Khim" which in Limbu language means "New Palace". This later went on to become "Sukhim" and "Sikkim". He was succeeded by his son Chakdor Namgyal, borne by his second wife in 1700. He had one last son with his third wife. Though he is not well known his grandson becomes a king of a small kingdom inside his father's rule.

References

Monarchs of Sikkim
1644 births
1700 deaths